Mederville is an unincorporated community in Clayton County, Iowa, United States.

History
Mederville is named for one of its founders, Henry Meder. Mederville's population was 48 in 1902, and 78 in 1925.

Education
Central Community School District of Elkader operates public schools serving the community.

References

Unincorporated communities in Clayton County, Iowa
Unincorporated communities in Iowa